The Guilderland Central School District serves approximately 5,700 students and encompasses most of the Town of Guilderland and part of the town of Bethlehem in Albany County, of New York's Capital District.

There are five elementary schools:
 Altamont- constructed in 1953
 Guilderland- constructed in 1955
 Lynnwood- constructed in 1968
 Pine Bush- constructed in 1994
 Westmere- constructed in 1953

 Farnsworth Middle School - constructed in 1970
 Guilderland High School - constructed in 1953

The Pine Bush Elementary School on Carman Road, Route 146, opened in September 1994. It was approved by the community due to the district's growing enrollment. It is the newest school in the district. In 1999, a major expansion and renovation project, supported by a $24 million bond issue, was completed at Guilderland High School. In October 2001, voters approved the expansion and renovation of Farnsworth Middle School—a $19.7 million project which was completed in September 2005. This project included a fourth gym and the entire Seneca House.

Guilderland's elementary school program develops students’ confidence in themselves as learners; instills a love of learning and a desire to learn; and develops the knowledge, skills and attitudes needed for students to communicate effectively, understand the world about them and participate effectively in a democratic society.

At Alton U. Farnsworth Middle School (the previous middle school was part of the current Guilderland High School prior to 1970), students build on this foundation as they continue their educational growth. Most students enroll in a second language (French, Italian, German or Spanish) in sixth grade (but some enroll in their sophomore and junior years of high school) and may enroll in Regents-level math and science courses in eighth grade. Middle School students develop the competence and confidence necessary to explore and refine their individual interests. Students are currently organized into four "houses" - Hiawatha, Seneca, Mohawk, and Tawasentha - and in grade-level teams within each house.

Guilderland High School provides a comprehensive and challenging program that ensures students will be successful in advanced educational studies, the work force or other post-graduate endeavors. Many taxpayers and school counselors have expressed concern that the school is eliminating many of the advanced courses that once placed it at very high prestige.  Some courses eliminated include Java 1 & 2, Woodshop and Digital Electronics. High school and college level courses provide students with many opportunities to develop and hone their skills, attitudes, and knowledge. Students may strive to obtain a "major" in any of the academic areas, elective disciplines such as art or music, or in occupational studies. They may earn AP and/or college credit in several educational fields.

References

External links 

 Guilderland Central School District

Guilderland, New York
School districts in New York (state)
Education in Albany County, New York